Lorena Bernal Pascual (born  12 May 1981) is an Argentine-Spanish actress, television host, and model.

Early life
Bernal was born in San Miguel de Tucumán, Argentina.  She moved to San Sebastián, Spain, when she was a year old, and studied at the French Lycée Français de Saint Sebastién in the city, then at Maurice Ravel school in Saint Jean de Luz across the border in France. She is fluent in Spanish, English and French.

Career
She has worked as a model since the age of 7 and began drama classes at the age of 13. She was  Miss Spain 1999 at the age of 17 and could not represent the country in Miss Universe due to her age, so instead she competed in Miss World where she was one of the 10 finalists.

Since then she has worked as a model, TV host and especially as an actress in Spain and in the US where she  appeared in the American television show Chuck as an international arms dealer and CSI: Miami in the role of Mía, a nanny, in the episode "My Nanny."

Personal life
She is married to Spanish former footballer Mikel Arteta, the former captain and current manager of the Premier League football club, Arsenal. 

The couple's first child, called Gabriel, was born in Spain in 2009.

Their second child, Daniel, was born in 2012, and their third child, Oliver, was also born in Spain in 2015.

Filmography
Stiletto 2008.
Unnatural causes 2006.
The Deal 2005.
El Kibris 2004.
Mendigares 2001.
Menos es más 2000.

Television series
Chuck 2007.
CSI: Miami 2007.
See Jayne Run 2007.
Homozapping 2005.
El Comisario 2005.
El pasado es mañana 2005.
Aida 2005.
La sopa boba 2004.
Se puede? 2004.
Luna Negra 2003–2004.
Paraiso 2002–2003.
Ala-Dina 2002.
El secreto 2001–2002.
El Señorío de Larrea 1999.

TV host 
 Gala Sebastia 2006 (IB3TV)
 Gala Castello 2005 
 Gala Palma Jove (2005) (IB3TV)
 Gala Mataro Solidario (2005) (Canal 7)
 Gala Geniales (homenaje a Carmen Sevilla) (2004) (TVE)
 Gala La Rioja universal (2004) (TVE)
 Gala Regio de Oro Awards (2004) (Canal 7)
 Gala End of the year (2002) (ETB)
 The Arthur show (13 programas) (2001)(ETB)
 Gala Int´I vasque channel for LatinAmerica (2001) (ETB)
 Gala New image channel (2001) (EITB)
 The first night (31 programas)(2000) (ETB)
 Gala 2000 Christmas Eve (2000) (ETB)
 Animalada total (1999) (ETB)
 Gala homenaje a Gila (1999) (TVE)
 Únicas (1999) (Antena 3 TV)

Commercials 
 Lois 1996
 Freixenet 1999
 Oro vivo 1999
 Pepe Jeans London 1999
 Prohibida, videoclip del cantante Raúl 2000. 
 Jesús Paredes 2000
 Nivea 2002 Telepromoción de Tele5.
 Campofrío 2004 Telepromoción de TVE.
 Dister 2004-2005
 Pantene pro v 2005
 Joyca 2005
 Oral B
 Depitotal
 Herbal Essence (2010)
 Eguzki Lore (2011)

See also
List of Argentines

References

External links

http://www.lorenabernal.es/ - Official website

Argentine emigrants to Spain
Argentine people of Basque descent
Miss World 1999 delegates
Miss Spain winners
1981 births
Spanish film actresses
Spanish female models
Living people
Spanish television actresses